The Sims Online, also known as EA-Land, was a massively multiplayer online variation on Maxis' computer game The Sims. It was published by Electronic Arts and released in December 2002 for Microsoft Windows. The game was sold in retail stores in North America and Japan and could also be downloaded worldwide through the EA.com online store, though the game was English-only and had no official translations. The game charged a subscription fee of US $9.99 per month. In March 2007, EA announced that the product would be re-branded as EA-Land and major enhancements would be made. EA later announced that the game would shut down all activity on August 1, 2008.

Gameplay

Four cities had special rules: Dragon's Cove contained harder game objectives. For example, a Sim would lose energy when traveling long distances, and the virtual costs for items were doubled. Betaville was a city created for the purpose of testing new features, such as the ability to create a family of up to four adult Sims, with adjustable free will levels; bills and a repo man; and fires and firemen. Another was Test Center, where the player could never move out of the city. Test Center Sims also started with three times the start-up money.

Skills 
Obtaining factual skills points was an important aspect of gameplay. They were necessary for receiving more money from paying objects and earning promotions in the offered career tracks. They were occasionally needed for special interactions with other players, such as serenading. A skill could be increased at a faster rate when multiple Sims in the lot worked on the same skill simultaneously.

The game had six core skills: Mechanical, Cooking, Charisma, Body, Creativity, and Logic. Skill level ranged in number from 0 to 20.99.

In-game employment
There were four official jobs available in The Sims Online: Restaurant, Robot Factory, DJ, and Dancing.

The in-game jobs did not offer a large salary, causing many players to seek out other sources. Popular methods included opening item shops, offering services to users such as food and lodging, or using objects to create items such as pizza (pizza object), essays (typewriter), or paintings (easel).

Economy
The Sims Online simulated a working economy. It was completely run by players. The largest and most active market in the game was real estate: players would buy, sell, and rent property to other players. However, due to not having a proper deed trade system in place until the start of EA-Land, many players faced security issues such as scamming.

There were many categories for player's properties: Welcome, Money, Skills, Services, Entertainment, Romance, Shopping, Games, Offbeat, and Residence. Each of these categories had special items that could only be used in that specific category. For example, players who joined a lot under the Service category could use a workbench to craft items, which would then often be sold to a player who owns a lot in the Shopping category who would sell the items at a higher retail price.

In early 2005, The Sims Online faced a bug, which was discovered and quickly spread in use throughout the game. A clothing rack, that normally players would use to sell clothes to other players, duplicated the owner's profits with each use beyond what the other player actually paid. This exploit could be repeated as often as wanted until the bug was fixed. This exploit was later patched; however, the game's economy was damaged. Land and items lost value. This economic problem was not resolved for three years, until late 2007 when EA-Land was formed and the game data was wiped.

Once EA-Land was in place, the economy was player-run. Players could additionally create custom content and sell these items to other players, and skills were a higher priority due to the requirement of in-game jobs and money objects.

EA-Land

In March 2007, Electronic Arts employee Luc Barthelet, who served as General Manager of Maxis during the development of The Sims, assembled a team to push significant updates to the game under a project titled "TSO-E".

A major update to the game was user custom content. The TSO-E developers were interested in user-submitted ideas on how they could maintain a stable economy to negate the gains players made illegitimately through exploits. Custom objects were enabled within TSO in late 2007, allowing players to upload .bmp and .jpg images as well as .iff files. Furniture could be created and uploaded in the form of single-tiled chairs, sculptures, and decorations and multi-tiled tables.

TSO-E developers combined the game's cities into two similar cities, re-branded the game as EA-Land, and erased player data. Test Center 3 was created freely accessible in hopes of expanding the game's userbase, and in-game ATMs were added, which could accept real money for Simoleons, in hopes of generating revenue.

Closure
In April 2008, four weeks after EA-Land was launched, it was announced that the development team had disassembled, and that the game would shut down on August 1 the same year. This day of announcement was referred to as the "EA-Land Sunset". Maxis stated that the development team would be moving on to other projects.

EA expressed disappointment in sales over the lifetime of the game. The Sims Online was widely seen as a failed attempt to port the single-player game to an online, multiplayer environment.

Reception

The Sims Online received generally mixed reviews from magazines and websites. Andrew Park from GameSpot stated

Later variations
The Sims Bustin' Out featured a very similar and free online play exclusive to the PlayStation 2 version that allowed players to play online and chat with a USB keyboard. This game shut down the same day as The Sims Online on August 1, 2008. In 2008, the lead developers of The Sims Online that had left Maxis founded and launched a free browser-based game called TirNua. MySims featured an online play mode aimed at younger children for PC. However, the server was shut down on November 26, 2011.

A similar revival of the game, called The Sims Social, released August 9, 2011 exclusively on Facebook. It allowed players to play with friends, chat and send items to each other. Electronic Arts and Maxis shut down The Sims Social, SimCity Social, and Pet Society on June 14, 2013.

On January 6, 2017, a fan-made relaunch of The Sims Online was created by Rhys Simpson, FreeSO and was released in an "open beta" phase. As of May 1, 2017, the majority of the original The Sims Online functions were re-implemented to include 3D functions. Some of the existing changes have included category functions.

Awards
E3 2002 Game Critics Awards: Best Simulation Game
IAA 2002: Best Massively Multiplayer

References

External links 
 
 

2002 video games
Inactive massively multiplayer online games
Interactive Achievement Award winners
Massively multiplayer online games
Massively multiplayer online role-playing games
North America-exclusive video games
Products and services discontinued in 2008
The Sims
Video games developed in the United States
Video games scored by Jerry Martin
Virtual economies
Windows games
Windows-only games

See also 
IMVU
Smeet